Barbara Petráhn (born 16 September 1978 in Sopron) is a Hungarian track and field sprinter who specializes in the 100 metres, 200 metres and 400 metres.

An 11 time Hungarian Athletics Championships winner in 400 metres, Petráhn matched the national record of the distance (51.50 seconds) in 2006, tying Ilona Pál's record set in 1980. She raced at two Olympics in this event in 2000 and 2008. In her first participation at the 2000 Summer Olympics in Sydney, Petráhn made it from the first round to the quarterfinals, where she came last in her heat and did not advance further. At the 2008 Summer Olympics in Beijing she came only fourth in her first round heat thus did not manage to go to the quarterfinals.

Beside 400 metres, she also had successes in 200 metres, most notably winning 5 Hungarian Athletics Championships titles, including four in a row between 2007 and 2010.

Personal bests
As of 20 May 2012

Outdoor

Indoor

Awards
 Hungarian athlete of the Year (1): 2007

References

External links
 

1978 births
Living people
People from Sopron
Hungarian female sprinters
Olympic athletes of Hungary
Athletes (track and field) at the 2000 Summer Olympics
Athletes (track and field) at the 2008 Summer Olympics
Olympic female sprinters
Female sprinters
Hungarian athletes
Sportspeople from Győr-Moson-Sopron County